Morthalli is a small village located at the bank of the Saraswati river in district Kurukshetra, Haryana state of India. Its population is nearly 1141. Its Panchayat is divided into three parts geographically: First is Morthalli, Second is Kantafarm and third one is Sandhufarm. It is near ancient Prachiya Temples on Guhla -Cheeka Road from the town Pehowa.

References

Villages in Kurukshetra district